Andrena humilis is a Palearctic species of mining bee.

References

External links
Images representing Andrena humilis 

Hymenoptera of Europe
humilis
Insects described in 1832